Lacy Rasco Overby (27 July 1920 – 5 December 1994) was a virologist known for his contributions to Hepatitis B and Hepatitis C research.

He earned bachelor's, master's and doctorate degrees in science and physics at Vanderbilt University (BA, 1941; MS, 1945; PhD, 1951).

He was awarded the Karl Landsteiner Memorial Award of the American Association of Blood Banks in 1992 together with Harvey J. Alter, Daniel W. Bradley, Qui-Lim Choo, Michael Houghton and George Kuo.

References

1920 births
1992 deaths
Vanderbilt University alumni
American virologists